The Rue Nicolas-Appert is a street located in Paris, France.

Location
The street is located in the Saint-Ambroise neighbourhood of the 11th arrondissement of Paris. It starts at the Passage Sainte-Anne Popincourt and runs all the way to the Rue Pelée.

History
It was constructed in 1985 and named in honor of Nicolas Appert (1749-1841), a French businessman who invented airtight food preservation.

The Comédie Bastille, a theatre, is located at number 5.

On 7 January 2015 the offices of the satirical weekly newspaper Charlie Hebdo at 10 rue Nicolas-Appert were attacked by Islamist terrorists. A commemorative plaque on the building records the names of eleven of the twelve people who were killed there. Charlie Hebdo has since moved.
 In September 2020, there a stabbing attack outside of the former headquarters of Charlie Hebdo.

References